Mihai Coste (born 9 December 1938) is a Romanian volleyball player. He competed in the men's tournament at the 1964 Summer Olympics.

References

1938 births
Living people
Romanian men's volleyball players
Olympic volleyball players of Romania
Volleyball players at the 1964 Summer Olympics
Sportspeople from Timișoara